Mawdesley is a civil parish in the Borough of Chorley, Lancashire, England.  It contains 18 buildings that are recorded in the National Heritage List for England as designated listed buildings.   Of these, one is listed at Grade I, the highest of the three grades, one is at Grade II*, the middle grade, and the others are at Grade II, the lowest grade.  The major building in the parish is Mawdesley Hall; this and two associated structure are listed.  The parish contains the village of Mawdesley, but is otherwise mainly rural.  Most of the listed buildings are, or originated as, farmhouses or farm buildings.  The other listed buildings include other houses, cottages, a bridge, and two churches.

Key

Buildings

References

Citations

Sources

Lists of listed buildings in Lancashire
Buildings and structures in the Borough of Chorley